Ministry of Transport was formed on 5 May 2006, from transformation of Ministry of Transport and Construction.

The ministry was concerned with various aspects of transport in Poland. In 2007 it was merged into Ministry of Infrastructure.

Ministers of Transport

References

External links
 Official government website of Poland

Poland, Transport, Construction and Marine Economy
Transport, Construction and Maritime Economy
Poland, Transport, Construction and Maritime Economy
2006 establishments in Poland
Poland
Poland
Transport organisations based in Poland